Gudiya is the name of an Indian Muslim woman who was tragically affected by the Kargil war and whose plight was prominently highlighted by the print and electronic media. She was married to Arif in 1999, 10 days before the sapper was called on duty to Kargil. Arif failed to return from the war and was declared an army deserter until the authorities realised that he had been taken prisoner of war and was in Pakistan. In the meanwhile, the 26-year-old woman, thinking Arif had died,  had been remarried by her relatives to another man, Taufiq in 2003, and was pregnant with his child.

A twist in Gudiya's life surfaced when the Pakistanis finally released Arif and he returned home to a warm welcome. Gudiya was then living with her parents in Kalunda village on the outskirts of Delhi. Gudiya then moved to Mundali village in Meerut district of Uttar Pradesh – about 75 km from Delhi at her inlaws house. She told the media assembled at the Village Panchayat that she wanted go with her first husband. The Islamic scholars present in the audience at that point of time applauded her decision, proclaiming it to be in accordance with the Shariat . The second marriage, they claimed, was illegal as she had not annulled her previous marriage.

However, an investigation by Rediff revealed that Gudiya reverted to her first husband Arif under pressure from him, his family members, the villagers and the religious leaders. In fact, Gudiya herself asserted dominant pressure in her decision by saying "It was everybody's decision". The entire process of Gudiya favouring her first husband over the second husband Taufeeq was done without informing the latter. Also, Gudiya's uncle Riyasat Ali said, "She was pressured by the people there. She was not allowed to speak. The clerics told her that she had to follow the Shariat and go to Arif. They said her son would become illegitimate if she did not. Taufeeq, on the other hand, said Gudiya had spoken to him on telephone five days before this incident. She had explained to him the pressure she was being under. Her father had even threatened to commit suicide if she did not go back to Arif.
Arif, who had proclaimed that it was his love for Gudiya which brought him back, declared he was ready to take his wife back but not the step-child.

Turbulent reunion with her first husband 
Arif, after initial reluctance, had agreed to accept his wife with the unborn baby with a caveat that he might send the child back to Taufiq after he grew up. She gave birth a month later. She also developed anaemia, suffered a miscarriage a couple of months later, underwent bouts of depression and had many gynecological problems. 15 months after the reunion, she succumbed to septicaemia in the Army Research and Referral Hospital in Delhi. A probable cause of depression for Gudiya was the fact that her brother-in-law and his wife taunted her because they thought she was unlucky, for, within a few days of the marriage, Arif had gone to fight in the war and went missing.

Film on the life of Gudiya 
Ad-filmmaker Prabhakar Shukla's first feature film, 'Kahaani Gudiya Ki' is based on the life of Gudiya. He said even though the lady died, the issue that the happenings raised is very much relevant. "My film is not only about what happened with Gudiya, but it's a panoramic view of the entire episode from Gudiya's point of view. That's besides paying homage to her," says Shukla, adding, "Gudiya died due to excessive mental trauma that led to multiple organ failure. Her death is the most tragic part of the entire episode, and the film questions why it happened to her."

References

Kargil War
Women in India
Marriage and religion
21st-century Indian Muslims